Terry Gene Carr (February 19, 1937 – April 7, 1987) was an American science fiction fan, author, editor, and writing instructor.

Background and discovery of fandom 

Carr was born in Grants Pass, Oregon. He attended the City College of San Francisco and the University of California, Berkeley from 1954 to 1959.

Carr discovered science fiction fandom in 1949, where he became an enthusiastic publisher of fanzines, which later helped open his way into the commercial publishing world.  (He was one of the two fans responsible for the hoax fan 'Carl Brandon' after whom the Carl Brandon Society takes its name.) Despite a long career as a science fiction professional, he continued to participate as a fan until his death. He was nominated five times for Hugos for Best Fanzine (1959–1961, 1967–1968), winning in 1959, was nominated three times for Best Fan Writer (1971–1973), winning in 1973, and was Fan Guest of Honor at ConFederation in 1986.

Professional work 
Though he published some fiction in the early 1960s, Carr concentrated on editing.  He first worked at Ace Books, establishing the Ace Science Fiction Specials series which published, among other novels, Behold the Man and The Warlord of the Air by Michael Moorcock, The Left Hand of Darkness by Ursula K. Le Guin and Rite of Passage by Alexei Panshin.

After conflicts with Ace head Donald A. Wollheim, he worked as a freelancer.  He edited an original story anthology series called Universe, and a popular series of The Best Science Fiction of the Year anthologies that ran from 1972 until his death in 1987.  He also edited numerous one-off anthologies over the same time span. He was nominated for the Hugo for Best Editor thirteen times (1973–1975, 1977–1979, 1981–1987), winning twice (1985 and 1987). His win in 1985 was the first time a freelance editor had won.

Terry Carr commissioned a first novel from William Gibson for the second series of Ace Science Fiction Specials, shortly after the Denver WorldCon, 1981. The purpose of the series was to give attention to first-time novelists. Gibson's fellow Ace Specials first-timers were Kim Stanley Robinson, Michael Swanwick, Lucius Shepard, Carter Scholz, and Howard Waldrop. William Gibson mentions Carr in the introduction to the 20th Anniversary Edition of the book: "Having been talked into signing a contract (by the late Terry Carr, without whom there would certainly be no Neuromancer) . . ."

Carr taught at the Clarion Workshop at Michigan State University in 1978, where his students included Richard Kadrey and Pat Murphy.

Personal life 
Carr married a fellow science fiction fan, Miriam Dyches, in 1959. They were divorced in 1961. Later that year, Carr married Carol Stuart. He remained married to her until his death. Under her married name of Carol Carr, his widow has also sold science fiction: "You Think You've Got Troubles" (1969), "Inside" (1970), "Some Are Born Cats" (1973, with Terry Carr), "Wally a Deux" (1973), and "Tooth Fairy" (1984).

Death
On April 7, 1987, Carr died of congestive heart failure. A memorial gathering of the science fiction community was held in Tilden Park in Berkeley, California on May 30. An original anthology of science fiction, Terry's Universe, was published the following year; all proceeds went to his widow. His papers and his large collection of fanzines (71 linear feet and almost 2000 titles) have become part of the Eaton collection of Science Fiction at the University of California, Riverside.

Published works

Novels
 Warlord of Kor (1963)
 Invasion From 2500 (1964, with Ted White using the joint pseudonym Norman Edwards)
 Cirque (1977)

Collections
 The Incompleat Terry Carr (1972, 1988)
 The Light at the End of the Universe (1976)
 Fandom Harvest (1986)

Anthologies

World's Best Science Fiction

World's Best Science Fiction: 1965 (1965 with Donald A. Wollheim)
World's Best Science Fiction: 1966 (1966 with Donald A. Wollheim)
World's Best Science Fiction: 1967 (1967 with Donald A. Wollheim)
World's Best Science Fiction: 1968 (1968 with Donald A. Wollheim)
World's Best Science Fiction: 1969 (1969 with Donald A. Wollheim)
World's Best Science Fiction: 1970 (1970 with Donald A. Wollheim)
World's Best Science Fiction: 1971 (1971 with Donald A. Wollheim)

The Best Science Fiction of the Year

The Best Science Fiction of the Year (1972)
The Best Science Fiction of the Year #2 (1973)
The Best Science Fiction of the Year #3 (1974)
The Best Science Fiction of the Year #4 (1975)
The Best Science Fiction of the Year #5 (1976)
The Best Science Fiction of the Year #6 (1977)
The Best Science Fiction of the Year #7 (1978)
The Best Science Fiction of the Year #8 (1979)
The Best Science Fiction of the Year #9 (1980)
The Best Science Fiction of the Year #10 (1981)
The Best Science Fiction of the Year #11 (1982)
The Best Science Fiction of the Year #12 (1983)
The Best Science Fiction of the Year #13 (1984)
Terry Carr's Best Science Fiction of the Year (1985)
Terry Carr's Best Science Fiction of the Year #15 (1986)
Terry Carr's Best Science Fiction and Fantasy of the Year #16 (1987)

Universe

Universe 1 (1971)
Universe 2 (1972)
Universe 3 (1973)
Universe 4 (1974)
Universe 5 (1975)
Universe 6 (1976)
Universe 7 (1977)
Universe 8 (1978)
Universe 9 (1979)
Universe 10 (1980)
Universe 11 (1981)
Universe 12 (1982)
Universe 13 (1983)
Universe 14 (1984)
Universe 15 (1985)
Universe 16 (1986)
Universe 17 (1987)

Other anthologies

 New Worlds of Fantasy (1967)
 New Worlds of Fantasy #2 (1970)
 New Worlds of Fantasy #3 (1971)
 Year's Finest Fantasy (1978)
 Year's Finest Fantasy 2 (July 1979)
 Fantasy Annual III (May 1981)
 Fantasy Annual IV (November 1981)
 Fantasy Annual V (November 1982)
 Science Fiction for People Who Hate Science Fiction (1966)
 The Others (1969)
 On Our Way to the Future (1970)
 This Side of Infinity (1972)
 Into the Unknown (1973)
 An Exaltation of Stars (1973)
 Fellowship of the Stars (1974)
 Worlds Near and Far (1974)
 Creatures from Beyond (1975)
 Planets of Wonder (1976)
 The Ides of Tomorrow (1976)
 The Infinite Arena (1977)
 To Follow a Star: Nine Science Fiction Stories About Christmas (1977)
 Classic Science Fiction: The First Golden Age (1978)
 Beyond Reality (1979)
 Dream's Edge (1980)
 A Treasury of Modern Fantasy (1981) with Martin H. Greenberg
 100 Great Fantasy Short Short Stories (1984) with Isaac Asimov and Martin H. Greenberg

References

 
 
 Plaid Works: Electronic OtherRealms #16

External links
 
 Terry Carr at Spacelight
 The Terry Carr Collection at the Eaton collection of Science Fiction
 Bibliography at SciFan
 
 
 
 "Warlord of Kor" at Project Gutenberg
 Carol Carr bibliography

1937 births
1987 deaths
20th-century American novelists
20th-century American short story writers
20th-century American male writers
American book editors
American male novelists
American male short story writers
American science fiction writers
American speculative fiction editors
City College of San Francisco alumni
Educators from Oregon
Hugo Award-winning editors
Hugo Award-winning fan writers
Male speculative fiction editors
Michigan State University faculty
Novelists from Oregon
People from Grants Pass, Oregon
Science fiction editors
University of California, Berkeley alumni